The 8th Canadian Comedy Awards, presented by the Canadian Comedy Foundation for Excellence (CCFE), honoured the best live, television, and film comedy of 2006 and was held on 12 October 2007 in London, Ontario. The ceremony was hosted by Ryan Belleville.

Canadian Comedy Awards, also known as Beavers, were awarded in 20 categories. Winners were picked by members of ACTRA (Alliance of Canadian Cinema, Television and Radio Artists), the Canadian Actors' Equity Association, the Writers Guild of Canada, the Directors Guild of Canada, and the Comedy Association.  The ceremony was held during the five-day Canadian Comedy Awards Festival which showcased performances by the nominees and other artists.  Two variety specials were taped and broadcast by The Comedy Network.

TV series Corner Gas led with six nominations followed by Royal Canadian Air Farce with five, the film Bon Cop, Bad Cop and Alan Park with four.  Bon Cop, Bad Cop received the most Beavers with, followed by Corner Gas, Rent-A-Goalie, and Alan Park with two each.

Festival

The 8th Canadian Comedy Awards and Festival ran from 9 to 13 October 2007 in London, Ontario, its fifth and final year in the city.  Each day featured talent showcases by local comics, nominees and other visiting performers.

Two variety specials taped at the festival were aired on The Comedy Network.  The Doo Wops – John Catucci and David Mesiano – were nominated for a Gemini Award for Best Ensemble Performance in a Comedy Program for Canadian Comedy Awards 2007: Best of the Fest.

Ceremony

The 8th Canadian Comedy Awards ceremony was held on 12 October 2007, hosted by Ryan Belleville. Beavers were awarded in 20 categories covering live performance, television and film.

Winners and nominees
Winners were voted on by members of ACTRA (Alliance of Canadian Cinema, Television and Radio Artists), the Canadian Actors' Equity Association, the Writers Guild of Canada, the Directors Guild of Canada, and the Comedy Association.

Nominees, chosen by juries, were announced on 25 July 2007. Voting was open from 15 August to 15 September. Nominees must have been Canadian, or been born in Canada or landed immigrants, or have done the bulk of their work in Canada.

Winners are listed first and highlighted in boldface:

Live

Television

Film

Special Awards

Most wins

The following people, shows, films, etc. received multiple awards

Most nominations

The following people, shows, films, etc. received multiple nominations.

References

External links
Canadian Comedy Awards official website

Canadian Comedy Awards
Canadian Comedy Awards
Awards
Awards